Idols South Africa IV is the fourth season of South African reality television series Idols South Africa. Idols South Africa is a competitive talent show based on Pop Idol in the United Kingdom. Idols South Africa IV premiered in September 2007 after a one-year hiatus.

The judging panel remained the same for the third season in a row; Colin Moss returned for what was to be his final season. As in previous seasons, each performer's score is an aggregate of the audience's votes (51%) and the judges' votes (49%).

The winner was 17-year-old Jody Williams, who bested Andriëtte Norman on 9 December 2007, at Ellis Park Stadium in Williams' hometown of Johannesburg. Williams was the youngest winner of the show to date, and she was the third consecutive woman to be named "SA Idol". Her winning song was a cover of "Love Is All Around" by Swedish singer Agnes Carlsson. (Carlsson was previously named the winner of Sweden's Idol 2005.)

Finals

Finalists
Ages are as stated in the contest.

Themes
15 October: Songs from the last Century
22 October: Crooners and Divas
29 October: Rock
5 November: Best of South Africa
12 November: New Millennium Magic
19 November: Seasons and Colours
26 November: My Idols
3 December: Judges Choice
10 December: Grand Finale

Elimination chart

The first four weeks are the semi-finals, followed by nine weeks of finals.

Live show details

Heat 1: Top 12 boys (16 September 2007)

Heat 2: Top 12 girls (23 September 2007)

Heat 3: Top 14 (30 September 2007)

Heat 4 – Top 12 (7 October 2007)

Live show 1: Songs from the Last Century (14 October 2007)

Live show 2: Crooners and Divas (21 October 2007)

Live show 3: Rock (28 October 2007)

Live show 4: Best of South Africa (4 November 2007)

Live show 5: New Millennium Magic (11 November 2007)

Live show 6: Seasons and Colours (18 November 2007)

Live show 7: My Idols (25 November 2007)

Live show 8: Choices (2 December 2007)

Live final (9 December 2007)

References

External links
 Idols website

Season 04
2007 South African television seasons